Water polo was contested for men only at the 1951 Pan American Games in Buenos Aires, Argentina.


Competing teams
Five teams contested the event.

Medalists

References
 
 
  .

1951
Events at the 1951 Pan American Games
Pan American Games
1951 Pan American Games